Carl Johan Thyselius (8 June 1811 – 11 January 1891) was a politician, state official, Justice of the Supreme Court of Sweden 1856–1860, minister of education and ecclesiastical affairs 1860–1863, Minister for Civil Service Affairs (responsible for trade, industry and ship transport) 1875–1880, and served as Prime Minister from 1883 to 1884.

Biography
Carl Johan Thyselius was born in Österhaninge, Södermanlands län, as the son of the vicar and future bishop  and Christina Margareta Bergsten.

Typical for his time, after an education in administration at Uppsala University, he combined a successful career in high-level official positions with major political assignments. He was, among other things, Justice of the Supreme Court of Sweden 1856–1860, minister of education and ecclesiastical affairs 1860–1863, president of the Kammarkollegium 1864-1875 and Minister for Civil Service Affairs 1875–1880. After Arvid Posse's resignation in 1883, Thyselius reluctantly became Prime Minister at the request of Oscar II for one year.

He died on 11 January 1891 in Stockholm.

Personal life
In 1848, Thyselius married Charlotta Melart, with whom he had a daughter.

Thyselius was Sweden's first prime minister not descended from the nobility. He was furthermore 72 years and 5 days old upon accession, making him the oldest person to become Prime Minister in Swedish history to this day.

See also
 Prime Minister of Sweden
 List of Swedish politicians

References 

1811 births
1891 deaths
People from Haninge Municipality
Burials at Norra begravningsplatsen
Prime Ministers of Sweden
Justices of the Supreme Court of Sweden
Governors of Kronoberg County
Uppsala University alumni
19th-century Swedish politicians
Members of the Första kammaren
19th-century Swedish judges
Swedish Ministers of Education and Ecclesiastical Affairs